The Journal for Nurse Practitioners is a peer-reviewed nursing journal for nurse practitioners and is the official journal of the American Association of Nurse Practitioners.

Abstracting and indexing 
The journal is covered by the following abstracting and indexing services: CINAHL and Scopus

External links 
 
 American Association of Nurse Practitioners

General nursing journals
English-language journals
Elsevier academic journals
Publications established in 2005
2005 establishments in the United States
10 times per year journals